Virumbugiren is a 2002 Indian Tamil-language romantic drama film directed by Susi Ganeshan. The film stars Prashanth and Sneha, while Eswari Rao played a pivotal role which fetched her Tamil Nadu State Film Award for Best Character Artiste (Female) and Nassar, Livingston and Sriman portrayed supporting roles. Deva composed the film's music while K. V. Anand handled the film's cinematography. The film released after much delay across Tamil Nadu in December 2002.

The film went on to gain success before release in 2001, by winning four Tamil Nadu State Film Awards including Best Film and Best Director for Susi Ganesan. Sneha also won the Best Actress award, while Easwari Rao scooped the Best Supporting Actress award.

Plot
Sivan is an aspiring designer. His hopes crash when he lands up with the responsibility of looking after his mother and younger brothers with his father's sudden death. Since his father dies while in service, Shivan is forced to take up his father's job as a fire service man. He meets Thavamani, a beautiful rustic while on a posting in a village, and they fall in love. But Thavamani's father and the whole village are against the lovers. How the lovers fight against all odds and win forms the rest of this love story.

Cast

 Prashanth as Sivan
 Sneha as Thavamani
 Nassar as Thavamani's father
 Easwari Rao as Latha
 Sriman
 Senthil
 Livingston as Latha's husband (in a guest appearance)
 Neelima as Thavamani's first sister
 Baby Heera as Thavamani's second sister
 Veerasami as Muthaiya
 Y.Gee.Mahendra
 Pandu
 Meesai Murugesan
 Scissor Manohar
 Vennira Aadai Nirmala
 Bhavana
 Theni Kunjarammal
 Vinu Chakravarthy
 Thaadi Balaji
 Alphonsa as dancer
 Robert as dancer

Production
In March 1999, Susi Ganeshan was able to convince producer Shanti Thiagarajan to fund his first feature film, after he left Mani Ratnam's team of assistant directors. The film was initially titled Thithikkum Thee and was to feature to Murali in the lead role of a firefighter. In return for producing his first film, Shanti Thiagarajan requested Ganeshan to also work on another film starring her son Prashanth in the lead role and consequently, Ganeshan finalised a script titled Pepsi: Generation Next. In a turn of events, Prashanth replaced Murali in the director's first project, which was retitled as Virumbugiren in early 2000.

The project, Virumbugiren, was launched at Hotel Chola Sheraton, Chennai on 19 January 2000 with Susi Ganeshan, an erstwhile assistant of Mani Ratnam being introduced as a director. It was announced that the film would have cinematography by K. V. Anand, music by Deva, lyrics by Vairamuthu, art by Thota Tharani editing by Suresh Urs and special effects by Venki; and it would be produced by Vandana Bhatt and Mary Francis under the banner of V.M. Creations. The event was compered by Uma Padmanabhan, while attendees included Kamal Haasan, Mani Ratnam and Prabhu Deva. Actor Vivek refused a role in the film citing that the script was so good that there was no need for a separate comedy track, while Prashanth underwent special training for his role as a fire fighter. Sneha applied for a role in the film after seeing and advertisement for the auditions in a newspaper.  The story of the film was taken from one of Susi Ganeshan's novels titled Vakkappatta Bhoomi.

Despite its launch in early 2000, the film went through production troubles and released nearly two years after the launch. A host of Prashanth starrers which were launched after Virumbugiren such as Star, Chocolate and Majunu were subsequently released earlier. Sneha, for whom Virumbugiren was the first film she signed, was reported to be amongst the reasons for the delay after her popularity created problems in her call schedules. The producer of the film had to approach Vijayakanth, the president of the actor's association (Nadigar Sangam) and Sarath Kumar, also an office bearer, to intervene and resolve the dispute. Similarly Susi Ganesan also completed and released another film, Five Star, in between the production delays.

Release
The film won critical acclaim upon release, with The Hindu describing it as a "welcome change". Sify.com praised the film labelling that "Prashanth is top class", "Sneha steals some of the scenes with a larkish spontaneity and vivacity", while that director Susi Ganesan who has written the story and screenplay has done a neat job." A critic from Nowrunning.com wrote that "Prashanth excels in his  and Sneha's performance in her first official film is commendable", adding that "as the tough father, Nasser has come up with a strong performance". The satellite rights of the film were sold to Jaya TV.

The film went on to gain success before release in 2001, by winning four Tamil Nadu State Film Awards including Best Film and Best Director for Susi Ganesan. Sneha also won the Best Actress award for her work in the film alongside Aanandham and Punnagai Desam, while Easwari Rao scooped the Best Supporting Actress award.

In 2004, Susi Ganesan came together with Prashanth again for a project titled Sakkarai, though the film was shelved after a single schedule. Positive commentary about the lead pair also prompted Prashanth to sign Sneha to feature in his 2005 film Aayudham.

Soundtrack

The soundtrack of the film was composed by Deva and lyrics were written by Vairamuthu.

References

External links
 

2002 films
2000s Tamil-language films
2002 romantic drama films
Indian romantic drama films
Films scored by Deva (composer)
Films directed by Susi Ganeshan